Clyde A. Jewett (January 18, 1907, Richland County, Wisconsin – November 3, 1983, Glendale, California) was a member of the Wisconsin State Assembly. He graduated from high school in Richland Center, Wisconsin. Later, he worked in the Fisher Body division at the Janesville GM Assembly Plant in Janesville, Wisconsin.

Political career
Jewett was elected to the Assembly in 1952. He was a Republican.

References

1907 births
1983 deaths
People from Richland County, Wisconsin
Republican Party members of the Wisconsin State Assembly
Politicians from Janesville, Wisconsin